Goertzen is a surname. Notable people with the surname include:

Glenda Goertzen (born 1967), Canadian writer
Kathi Goertzen (1958–2012), American television journalist
Kelvin Goertzen (born 1969), Canadian politician
Mary Lou Goertzen (1929–2020), American artist
Steven Goertzen (born 1984), Canadian ice hockey player

German-language surnames
Surnames of German origin
Russian Mennonite surnames